Alain Vasselle (born 27 June 1947) is a former member of the Senate of France, representing the Oise department. He is a member of the Union for a Popular Movement.

References
Page on the Senate website 

1947 births
Living people
Union for a Popular Movement politicians
French Senators of the Fifth Republic
Senators of Oise
Place of birth missing (living people)
French farmers
20th-century farmers
21st-century farmers